Johannes Gufler (born 28 August 1946) is an Austrian sports shooter. He competed in two events at the 1988 Summer Olympics.

References

1946 births
Living people
Austrian male sport shooters
Olympic shooters of Austria
Shooters at the 1988 Summer Olympics
People from Landeck District
Sportspeople from Tyrol (state)
20th-century Austrian people